Pseudarmadillo is a genus of woodlice from the Greater Antilles. All extant species live in Cuba, with one species also extending to the Bahamas:
Pseudarmadillo agramontino Armas & Juarrero de Varona, 1999 – Camagüey Province
Pseudarmadillo assoi Armas & Juarrero de Varona, 1999 – Cienfuegos Province
Pseudarmadillo auritus Armas & Juarrero de Varona, 1999 – Sancti Spíritus Province
Pseudarmadillo bidentatus Armas & Juarrero de Varona, 1999 – Guantánamo Province
Pseudarmadillo buscki Boone, 1934 – La Habana Province
Pseudarmadillo carinulatus Saussure, 1857 – Cuba and the Bahamas
Pseudarmadillo elegans Armas & Juarrero de Varona, 1999 – Isla de la Juventud
Pseudarmadillo gillianus Richardson, 1902 – La Habana Province, Isla de la Juventud
Pseudarmadillo holguinensis Armas & Juarrero de Varona, 1999 – Holguín Province
Pseudarmadillo hoplites (Boone, 1934) – Camagüey Province
Pseudarmadillo jaumei Armas & Juarrero de Varona, 1999 – Guantánamo Province
Pseudarmadillo maiteae Juarrero de Varona & Armas, 2002 – Santiago de Cuba Province
Pseudarmadillo mitratus Armas & Juarrero de Varona, 1999 – Las Tunas Province
Pseudarmadillo nanus Armas & Juarrero de Varona, 1999 – Cienfuegos Province
Pseudarmadillo spinosus Armas & Juarrero de Varona, 1999 – Sancti Spíritus Province
Pseudarmadillo vansicklei Juarrero de Varona & Armas, 2003 – Santiago de Cuba Province

Two extinct species are also known from possibly Burdigalian age Dominican amber found on Hispaniola:
P. cristatus Schmalfuss, 1984
P. tuberculatus Schmalfuss, 1984

The genus is often considered a member of the Pseudarmadillidae, of which it is the only genus. It has also been placed, together with Cuzcodinella oryx in the family Delatorreiidae, Delatorreia being a synonym of Pseudarmadillo.

References

Woodlice
Fauna of Cuba
Extant Burdigalian first appearances
Fossil taxa described in 1857